The  was a secondary title contested in the Japanese professional wrestling promotion Osaka Pro Wrestling. It was established in 2008 as the Osaka Pro Wrestling Owarai Championship (before being renamed in 2019) when Kanjyuro Matsuyama declared himself the first Owarai Champion upon vacating the Osaka Meibutsu Sekaiichi Championship.

Being a professional wrestling championship, it was not won via direct competition; it was instead won via a predetermined ending to a match or awarded to a wrestler because of a wrestling angle. There have been twenty-three reigns by fourteen wrestlers with three vacancies. The last champion was Billyken Kid.

Title history

Names

Reigns

Combined reigns

Notes

References

External links

Osaka Pro Wrestling championships
Openweight wrestling championships